Studds may refer to:

 Gerry Studds (1937–2006), American politician.
 Robert Francis Anthony Studds (1896–1962), American admiral and engineer, fourth Director of the United States Coast and Geodetic Survey.

See also

Studd (disambiguation)